Johann August Natterer (19 October 1821 – 25 December 1900) was an Austrian physician and chemist.

Born in Vienna, he was a nephew to naturalist Johann Natterer (1787–1843). In 1847, he obtained his medical doctorate from the University of Vienna, later practicing medicine in Wien-Leopoldstadt.

Along with his brother Josef Natterer (1819–1862), he is remembered for pioneer experiments in the field of photography. In 1841, using a 
Voigtländer camera  on daguerreotype plates that were prepared according to a chemical process developed by Franz Kratochwila, they were able to increase the sensitivity five-fold, and reportedly achieved exposure times as low as 5 to 6 seconds in clear weather.

In the mid-1840s, using a compressed air chamber pump invented by J. Schembor (1777–1851), he was the first scientist to produce liquid carbon dioxide in significant quantities. His name is associated with a sealed and constant volume vessel known as a "Natterer's tube".

References 

1900 deaths
1821 births
Scientists from Vienna
University of Vienna alumni
Austrian chemists